Hyphessobrycon axelrodi is a species of tetra in the family Characidae.

Named in honor of pet-book publisher Herbert R. Axelrod (1927-2017), who collected the type specimen.

Description
Hyphessobrycon axelrodi is a small, iridescent, silver fish with white-tipped dorsal, anal and pelvic fins. It also has a red tail. Females are duller, with faint gray-tipped fins and a dull pink tail.

Distribution
Hyphessobrycon axelrodi is native to the island nation of Trinidad. It inhabits low elevations in fresh and brackish waters near swampy areas.

References

http://www.theaquariumwiki.com/wiki/Hyphessobrycon_axelrodi
http://www.fishbase.org/summary/12397
http://www.aquariumglaser.de/en/fish-archives/hyphessobrycon_axelrodi_en/

Characidae
Taxa named by Harogldo Pereira Travassos
Fish described in 1959